Arthur Stanton Adams (July 1, 1896 – November 18, 1980) was an American academic most notable for having served as the President of the University of New Hampshire. He also served as Assistant Dean of Engineering and Director of the Engineering Science Management War Training Program and Provost at Cornell. In 1948 he was appointed the 8th president of the University of New Hampshire. He was chairman of the Reserve Forces Policy Board at the United States Department of Defense from 1953 to 1955. From 1962-1965, he served as the second president of the Salzburg Global Seminar, a non-profit organization based in Salzburg, Austria, whose mission is to challenge current and future leaders to develop creative ideas for solving global problems. Dr. Adams co-authored The Development of Physical Thought and Fundamentals of Thermodynamics.

Born in Winchester, Massachusetts, Adams was a 1918 graduate of the United States Naval Academy and served as an officer in the U.S. Navy. Released from active duty as a lieutenant (junior grade) in November 1921 after a service injury, he began to pursue an academic career. Adams studied Physics at the University of California at Berkeley, earning a master's degree. He also obtained a doctor of science degree in Metallurgy from the Colorado School of Mines. After the United States entered World War II, Adams returned to active duty in the Navy as a lieutenant commander in June 1942. By April 1944, he had been promoted to captain and made director of the V-12 Navy College Training Program.

Adams and his wife Dorothy Anderson Adams (July 17, 1898 – August 12, 1954) are buried at Arlington National Cemetery.

Adams died on November 18, 1980 at the age of 84, in Concord, New Hampshire.

In 2010,  The University of New Hampshire converted one of the towers of the closed The New England Center and Hotel into a student residence, that was renamed Adams Tower West, in his honor.   After Adams Presidency he had returned to UNH as a consultant on the establishment of the New England Center for Continuing Education.

References

External links
University of New Hampshire: Office of the President
Full list of University Presidents (including interim Presidents) , University of New Hampshire Library
"Guide to the Arthur S. Adams Papers, 1948-1950", University of New Hampshire Library

1896 births
1980 deaths
United States Naval Academy alumni
UC Berkeley College of Letters and Science alumni
Colorado School of Mines alumni
Colorado School of Mines faculty
Cornell University faculty
Presidents of the University of New Hampshire
Burials at Arlington National Cemetery
United States Navy captains
20th-century American naval officers
United States Navy personnel of World War II
20th-century American academics